William Mason Fassett (January 28, 1876 – March 23, 1958) was a United States Army officer in the late 19th and early 20th centuries. He served in the Spanish–American War, Philippine–American War, and World War I, and he received the Army Distinguished Service Medal among several other awards.

Biography

Fassett was born on January 28, 1876, in Nashua, New Hampshire. He graduated from the United States Military Academy in 1897 and was commissioned into the infantry.

Fassett served in the Spanish–American War in Santiago de Cuba, and he earned a Silver Star in that conflict. He then participated in the Philippine–American War.

Fassett spent two years as a student officer at Fort Leavenworth, graduating from the Army School of the Line in 1908 and the Army Staff College in 1909.

After serving in various positions in the United States, Fassett became the Chief of Staff of the 31st Infantry Division. After his promotion to the rank of brigadier general on October 1, 1918, Fassett assumed command of the 37th Division of the American Expeditionary Forces (AEF). In addition to receiving the Army Distinguished Service Medal for his performance, Belgium awarded him the Croix de Guerre and France awarded him the Legion of Honour. The citation for his Army DSM reads:

After reverting to his permanent rank of colonel, Fassett retired from the military in January 1924. Congress restored his brigadier general rank in June 1930. As a retiree, Fassett raised citrus fruit in Florida, and he died in Orlando on March 23, 1958.

Personal life
Fassett never married.

References

Bibliography

1876 births
1958 deaths
People from Nashua, New Hampshire
United States Military Academy alumni
Military personnel from New Hampshire
United States Army Infantry Branch personnel
American military personnel of the Spanish–American War
Recipients of the Silver Star
American military personnel of the Philippine–American War
United States Army Command and General Staff College alumni
United States Army generals of World War I
Recipients of the Distinguished Service Medal (US Army)
Officiers of the Légion d'honneur
Recipients of the Croix de guerre (Belgium)
United States Army generals
Citrus farmers from Florida